UMU may refer to one of the following universities:

 Umeå University in Sweden

University of Manchester Union in England
University of Murcia in Spain
Upstate Medical University, Syracuse, New York
University of Mount Union in Alliance, Ohio

UMU may refer to:
 UMU Ltd, a British company that develops anti-virus computer software for mobile devices
 A quote from Nero Claudius from the anime/video game series Fate/Extra

See also 
 Umu (disambiguation)